Mimoza Veliu (born 28 March 1979) is an Albanian photographer, based in Berlin.

At the center of her art photography is the human being who opposes apparent boundaries. In 2008 she was awarded the first prize for art photography from Kosova National Art Gallery together with the colleague from Italy Linda Vukaj Riccomini.

Veliu was born in Tetovo, SR Macedonia, SFR Yugoslavia (now North Macedonia).

References

External links 
 Mimoza Veliu Photography

1979 births
Living people
Albanians in North Macedonia
Albanian photographers
Albanian women photographers
21st-century women photographers